Gunzelin VI of Schwerin (died: 1327) was a son of Count Niklot I of Schwerin and his wife, Elisabeth of Holstein.  In 1323, he succeeded his father in Schwerin-Wittenburg.

He was married to Richardis of Tecklenburg, daughter of Count Otto IV of Tecklenburg.  They had five children:
 Otto (d. 1357)
 Nicholas (d. 1367)
 Matilda, married Count Henning of Gützkow
 Beata, in 1334 married Albert IV, Duke of Saxe-Lauenburg
 Richardis (d. 1384), married Valdemar V, Duke of Schleswig

1327 deaths
14th-century German nobility
Counts of Schwerin
Year of birth unknown